St Mary's Church in South Tidworth, Wiltshire, England, was built in 1878. It is recorded in the National Heritage List for England as a designated Grade I listed building, and is now a redundant church in the care of the Churches Conservation Trust.

The church is built of rock-faced brown stone, in a style described by Historic England as "spectacular Geometrical Gothic". It was designed by John Johnson, with work supervised by G.H. Gordon, for Sir John Kelk. Kelk, an engineer and major building contractor who owned the Tedworth House estate nearby, had previously worked with Johnson on the construction of the Alexandra Palace. St Mary's cost Kelk £12,000. The site is near that of the medieval parish church.

There are also north and south aisles, a north vestry and a south porch. At the west end is a tall and slender bell turret with a tapering spire, also known as a flèche, above a massive stepped buttress. Nikolaus Pevsner calls the bell tower "perverse and wilful...à la Burges".

Pevsner considers the interior "sensational, in scale as in everything else". It includes carvings and polished marble shafts in the columns of the arcade piers. The chancel floor is laid with Italian mosaic. There is also a silver chalice and patens of 1837 and 1877 and a silver-gilt flagon of 1869. The altar and other carved stonework are by Farmer & Brindley. The stained glass is by Clayton and Bell, apart from the east window which was designed by Heaton, Butler and Bayne.

The church was declared redundant on 1 September 1972, and was vested in the Trust on 19 December 1973. Access to the church is restricted after vandalism in 2016.

See also
 List of churches preserved by the Churches Conservation Trust in Southwest England

References

Sources
 

Church of England church buildings in Wiltshire
19th-century Church of England church buildings
Grade I listed churches in Wiltshire
Churches preserved by the Churches Conservation Trust
Redundant churches
Gothic Revival church buildings in England
Gothic Revival architecture in Wiltshire
John Johnson buildings
Churches completed in 1878
Religious organizations disestablished in 1972
Saint Mary's Church